Ips grandicollis, known generally as eastern five-spined engraver, is a species of typical bark beetle in the family Curculionidae. Other common names include the eastern five-spined ip and southern pine engraver. 
Ips grandicollis use trap trees of the genus Pinus as food and a habitat.

References

Further reading

External links

 

Scolytinae